

Awards

Best Song
El Canto del Loco — "Eres Tonto"
Miguel Bosé (featuring Bimba Bosé) — "Como Un Lobo"
Amaral — "Kamikaze"
Chambao — "Papeles Mojados"
Pereza — "Estrella Polar"

Best Video
El Canto del Loco — "Eres Tonto"
Nena Daconte — "Tenía Tanto Que Darte"
Beatriz Luengo — "Pretendo Hablarte"
Amaral — "Kamikaze"
Pignoise — "Súbete A Mi Cohete"

Best Album
El Canto del Loco — Personas
Estopa — Allenrock
Amaral — Gato Negro Dragón Rojo
La Oreja de Van Gogh — A las cinco en el Astoria
Rosario — Parte de Mi

Best Solo
Manuel Carrasco
Melendi
Rosario
Manolo García
Miguel Bosé

Best Group
El Canto del Loco
Estopa
Amaral
La Oreja de Van Gogh
Nena Daconte

Best New Act
Despistaos
Beatriz Luengo
The Cabriolets
Najwajean
No Way Out

Best Tour
El Canto del Loco
Amaral
Coldplay
Madonna
Rock in Rio

Best Argentine Act
Andrés Calamaro
Babasónicos
Axel
Gustavo Cerati
Miranda!

Best Chilean Act
Kudai
Denise Rosenthal 
Shamanes
De Saloon
Nicole Natalino

Best Colombian Act
Cabas
Los de Adentro
Fonseca
Tinto
Katamarán

Best Costa Rican Act
Por Partes
Akasha
El Parque
Evolución
Percance

Best Ecuadorian Act
Fausto Miño
Daniel Betancourth
Chaucha
Papá Changó
Rockvox

Best Guatemalan Act
El Tambor de la Tribu
Viento en contra
Sabrina
Sofía
Tavo Bárcenas

Best Mexican Act
Belanova
Maná
Julieta Venegas
Café Tacuba
Ximena Sariñana

Best Panamanian Act
Flex
Os Almirantes
Sr. Loop
El Roockie 
Eddy Lover (featuring La Factoría)

Best Latin Song
Eros Ramazzotti and Ricky Martin — "No Estamos Solos"
Juanes — "Gotas de Agua Dulce"
Maná — "Si No Te Hubieras Ido"
Belinda — "Bella Traición"
Julieta Venegas — "El Presente"

Best Latin Act
Julieta Venegas
Maná
Juanes
Ricky Martin 
Belinda

Best International Song
Kate Ryan — "Ella, elle l'a"
Duffy — "Mercy"
Alicia Keys — "No One"
OneRepublic — "Apologize"
Amy Winehouse — "Rehab"

Best International Act
Amy Winehouse 
Duffy
Coldplay
Alicia Keys
Madonna

Special awards
For his contribution to music through films: Jim Carrey
Career achievement award: Beyoncé

Live performances

Main show
Kate Ryan — "Ella, elle l'a"
Estopa — "Cuando Amanece"
The Cabriolets — "Poco A Poco"
Take That — "Greatest Day"
Rosario — "No Dudaría"
Beatriz Luengo — "Pretendo hablarte"
Keane — "The Lovers Are Losing"
Beyoncé — "If I Were a Boy"
Nena Daconte — "Tenía Tanto que Darte"
Craig David (featuring Álex Ubago) — "Walking Away"
El Canto del Loco (featuring Calle 13 and Mayumaná) — "Eres Tonto / No Hay Nadie Como Tú"

Concerts
La Oreja de Van Gogh
James Blunt
Anastacia

2008 music awards
Los Premios 40 Principales
2008 in Spanish music